The following is a list of the 21 cantons of the Haute-Vienne department, in France, following the French canton reorganisation which came into effect in March 2015:

 Aixe-sur-Vienne
 Ambazac
 Bellac
 Châteauponsac
 Condat-sur-Vienne
 Couzeix
 Eymoutiers
 Limoges-1
 Limoges-2
 Limoges-3
 Limoges-4
 Limoges-5
 Limoges-6
 Limoges-7
 Limoges-8
 Limoges-9
 Panazol
 Rochechouart
 Saint-Junien
 Saint-Léonard-de-Noblat
 Saint-Yrieix-la-Perche

References